Margret the Adroit was an Icelandic carver of the 12th and early 13th centuries.

Career 
Margret the Adroit appears in a single textual source: the Icelandic saga Páls saga biskups (Saga of Bishop Páll). She lived in Skálholt, as the wife of Thorir the priest, who assisted Bishop Páll Jónsson and managed the see after the bishop's death in 1211. At the time, it was common for bishops to send and receive expensive gifts from other bishops and noblemen. According to the saga, "Margret made everything that Bishop Pall wanted." As a gift for the Archbishop, Bishop Páll commissioned a "bishop's crozier of walrus ivory, carved so skilfully that no one in Iceland had ever seen such artistry before; it was made by Margaret the Adroit, who at that time was the most skilled carver in all Iceland." He also commissioned an altarpiece and "Margret carved the walrus ivory extremely well."

Claims regarding the Lewis Chessmen 
In 2010 at a conference at the National Museum of Scotland on the Lewis Chessmen, Gudmundur Thorarinsson (a civil engineer and a former member of the Icelandic Parliament) and Einar S. Einarsson (a former president of Visa Iceland and a friend of the chess champion Bobby Fischer) argued that Margret the Adroit made the chessmen. It is a claim that US author Nancy Marie Brown supports in her 2015 book, Ivory Vikings, the Mystery of the Most Famous Chessmen in the World and the Woman Who Made Them.

References

Notes 
 Páls saga is edited and translated in

External links 
 The Lewis Chess pieces at National Museums of Scotland
 British Museum: The Lewis Chessmen
 The Economist. "Bones of Contention"
 New York Times coverage of Icelandic claims
 Chess News: "The enigma of the Lewis chessmen"
"Are the Isle of Lewis Chessmen Icelandic?" by Guðmundur G. Þórarinsson (summary of argument)
Chess News: "The Lewis Chessmen on a Fantasy Iceland" (counterargument to Þórarinsson's)

Icelandic women artists
Medieval Icelandic artists
Icelandic sculptors
Icelandic women sculptors
13th-century sculptors
13th-century Icelandic people
13th-century Icelandic women
Medieval artists